Arisaema jacquemontii is a species of flowering plant from the family Araceae that can be found growing on rocky slopes and in the forests on the elevation of  in 'Afghanistan, East Asia and Himalayas. The species name refers to French botanist Victor Jacquemont.

Description
The flowers bloom from June to July which are dioecious and bisexual. They are being pollinated by various flies.

References

jacquemontii
Flora of Asia
Flora of Afghanistan